Eurodollars are U.S. dollars held in time deposit accounts in banks outside the United States, which thus are not subject to the legal jurisdiction of the U.S. Federal Reserve. Consequently, such deposits are subject to much less regulation than deposits within the U.S. The term was originally applied to U.S. dollar accounts held in banks situated in Europe, but it expanded over the years to cover US dollar accounts held anywhere outside the U.S. Thus, a U.S. dollar-denominated deposit in Tokyo or Beijing would likewise be deemed a Eurodollar deposit (sometimes an Asiadollar). The offshore locations of the Eurodollar make it exposed to potential country risk and economic risk.

There is no connection with the euro currency of the European Union. More generally, the euro- prefix can be used to indicate any currency held in a country where it is not the official currency, broadly termed "eurocurrency", for example, Euroyen or even Euroeuro.

History 
After World War II, the quantity of physical U.S. dollar banknotes outside the United States increased significantly, as a result of both the dollar funding of the Marshall Plan and from dollar proceeds of European exports to the U.S., which had become the largest consumer market.

As a result, large amounts of U.S. dollar banknotes were in the custody of foreign banks outside the United States. Some foreign countries, including the Soviet Union, also had deposits in U.S. dollars in American banks, evidenced by  certificates of deposit. Various narrations are given of the creation of the first eurodollar account, but most trace back to Communist governments keeping dollar deposits abroad.

In one version, the first eurodollar account was created in France in favour of Communist China, which in 1949 managed to move almost all of its U.S. dollar banknotes to the Soviet-owned Banque Commerciale pour l'Europe du Nord in Paris before the United States froze its remaining U.S. situated assets during the Korean War.

In another version, the first eurodollar account was created by an English bank in favour of the Soviet Union during the Cold War, following the invasion of Hungary in 1956, as the Soviet Union feared that its deposits in North American banks would be frozen as a sanction. It therefore decided to move some of its U.S. dollars held directly in North American banks to the Moscow Narodny Bank, an English limited liability company registered in London in 1919, whose shares were owned by the Soviet Union. The English bank would then re-deposit the dollars into U.S. banks. Thus although in reality the dollars never left North America, there would be no chance of the U.S. confiscating that money, because now it belonged legally to the British bank and not directly to the Soviets, the beneficial owners. Accordingly, on 28 February 1957, the sum of $800,000 was duly transferred, creating the first eurodollars. Initially dubbed "Eurobank dollars" after the bank's telex address, they eventually became known as "eurodollars" as such deposits were at first held mostly by European banks and financial institutions. A major role was played by City of London banks, such as Midland Bank, now part of HSBC, and their offshore holding companies.

In the mid-1950s, Eurodollar trading and its development into a dominant world currency began when the Soviet Union wanted better interest rates on their Eurodollars and convinced an Italian banking cartel to give them more interest than could have been earned if the dollars were deposited in the U.S. The Italian bankers then had to find customers ready to borrow the Soviet dollars and pay above the U.S. legal interest-rate caps for their use, and were able to do so; thus, Eurodollars began to be used increasingly in global finance.

Eurodollars being a riskier asset than dollars held directly in U.S. bank accounts demand in compensation a higher interest rate. U.S. banks, which hold required reserve accounts at the U.S. Federal Reserve, can receive unlimited financial support from the Fed if necessary, and are thus unlikely to become bankrupt. Thus, U.S. dollar deposits in U.S. banks are inherently less risky than Eurodollar deposits in banks which have no possibility of financial support from the Fed.

By the end of 1970, 385 billion eurodollars were held in offshore bank accounts. These deposits were lent on as U.S. dollar loans to businesses in other countries where interest rates on loans were perhaps much higher in the local currency, and where the businesses were exporting to the U.S. and receiving payment in dollars, thereby avoiding foreign exchange risk on their funding arrangements.

Several factors led eurodollars to overtake certificates of deposit (CDs) issued by U.S. banks as the primary private short-term money market instruments by the 1980s, including:
 The successive balance of payments deficits of the United States, causing a net outflow of dollars;
 Regulation Q, the U.S. Federal Reserve's ceiling on interest payable on domestic deposits during the high inflation of the 1970s
 Eurodollar deposits were a cheaper source of funds because they were free of reserve requirements and deposit insurance assessments

Market size 

Since the Eurodollar market is not run by any government agency its growth is hard to estimate. However, the Eurodollar market is by a wide margin the largest source of global finance. In 1997, nearly 90% of all international loans were made this way.

In December 1985 the Eurodollar market was estimated by J.P. Morgan Guaranty bank to have a net size of 1.668 trillion. In 2016, the Eurodollar market size was estimated at around 13.833 trillion.

Futures contracts 

The Eurodollar futures contract refers to the financial futures contract based upon these deposits, traded at the Chicago Mercantile Exchange (CME). More specifically, EuroDollar futures contracts are derivatives on the interest rate paid on those deposits. A Eurodollar future is a cash settled futures contract whose price moves in response to the LIBOR interest rate.
Eurodollar futures are a way for companies and banks to lock in an interest rate today, for money they intend to borrow or lend in the future. Each CME Eurodollar futures contract has a notional or "face value" of $1,000,000, though the leverage used in futures allows one contract to be traded with a margin of about one thousand dollars.

CME Eurodollar futures prices are determined by the market's forecast of the 3-month USD LIBOR interest rate expected to prevail on the settlement date. A price of 95.00 implies an interest rate of 100.00 - 95.00, or 5%. The settlement price of a contract is defined to be 100.00 minus the official British Bankers' Association fixing of 3-month LIBOR on the day the contract is settled.

How the Eurodollar futures contract works 

For example, if on a particular day an investor buys a single three-month contract at 95.00 (implied settlement LIBOR of 5.00%):

 if at the close of business on that day, the contract price has risen to 95.01 (implying a LIBOR decrease to 4.99%), US$25 will be bought from the investor's margin account; or
 if at the close of business on that day, the contract price has fallen to 94.99 (implying a LIBOR increase to 5.01%), US$25 will be sold from the investor's margin account.

On the settlement date, the settlement price is determined by the actual LIBOR fixing for that day rather than a market-determined contract price.

History
The Eurodollar futures contract was launched in 1981, as the first cash-settled futures contract. People reportedly camped out the night before the contract's open, flooding the pit when the CME opened the doors. That trading pit was the largest pit ever, nearly the size of a football field, and quickly became one of the most active on the trading floor, with over 1500 traders and clerks coming to work every day on what was then known as the CME's upper trading floor. That floor is no longer, with the CME having moved over to the CBOT's trading floor and 98% of Eurodollar trading now done electronically.

Eurodollar futures contract as synthetic loan 

A single Eurodollar future is similar to a forward rate agreement to borrow or lend  for three months starting on the contract settlement date. Buying the contract is equivalent to lending money, and selling the contract short is equivalent to borrowing money.

Consider an investor who agreed to lend  on a particular date for three months at 5.00% per annum (months are calculated on a 30/360 basis). Interest received in 3 months' time would be  × 5.00% × 90 / 360 = . 
 If the following day, the investor is able to lend money from the same start date at 5.01%, he or she would be able to earn  × 5.01% × 90 / 360 =  of interest. Since the investor only is earning  of interest, he or she has lost  as a result of interest rate moves.
 On the other hand, if the following day, the investor is able to lend money from the same start date only at 4.99%, he or she would be able to earn only  × 4.99% × 90 / 360 =  of interest. Since the investor is in fact earning  of interest, he or she has gained  as a result of interest rate moves.

This demonstrates the similarity. However, the contract is also different from a loan in several important respects:
Moreover, the present value change per 0.01% change in interest rate is higher in low interest rate environments and lower in high interest rate environments. This is to say that an actual loan has convexity. This is one reason that Eurodollar futures are not a perfect proxy for expected interest rates. This difference can be adjusted for by reference to the implied volatility of options on Eurodollar futures.
 In an actual loan, the lender takes credit risk to a borrower. In Eurodollar futures, the principal of the loan is never disbursed, so the credit risk is only on the margin account balance. Moreover, even that risk is the risk of the clearinghouse, which is considerably lower than even unsecured single-A credit risk.

Other features of Eurodollar futures 

40 quarterly expirations and 4 serial expirations are listed in the Eurodollar contract.
This means that on 1 January 2011, the exchange will list 40 quarterly expirations (March, June, September, December for 2011 through 2020), the exchange will also list another four serial (monthly) expirations (January, February, April, May 2011). This extends tradeable contracts over ten years, which provides an excellent picture of the shape of the yield curve. The front-month contracts are among the most liquid futures contracts in the world, with liquidity decreasing for the further out contracts. Total open interest for all contracts is typically over 10 million.

The CME Eurodollar futures contract is used to hedge interest rate swaps. There is an arbitrage relationship between the interest rate swap market, the forward rate agreement market and the Eurodollar contract. CME Eurodollar futures can be traded by implementing a spread strategy among multiple contracts to take advantage of movements in the forward curve for future pricing of interest rates.

Sweeps 

In United States banking, Eurodollars are a popular option for what are known as "sweeps". Until 21 July 2011, banks were not allowed to pay interest on corporate checking accounts. To accommodate larger businesses, banks may automatically transfer, or sweep, funds from a corporation's checking account into an overnight investment option to effectively earn interest on those funds. Banks usually allow these funds to be swept either into money market mutual funds, or alternately they may be used for bank funding by transferring to an offshore branch of a bank.

See also 
Eurobond
International status and usage of the euro
Petroeuro
Swap
TED spread

References 

International finance
Money market instruments